Chulinsky is a rural locality (a khutor) in Novonikolayevskoye Rural Settlement, Novonikolayevsky District, Volgograd Oblast, Russia. The population was 55 as of 2010. There are 6 streets.

Geography 
Chulinsky is located in steppe, on the Khopyorsko-Buzulukskaya Plain, 8 km southeast of Novonikolayevsky (the district's administrative centre) by road. Novonikolayevsky is the nearest rural locality.

References 

Rural localities in Novonikolayevsky District